James the Just, or a variation of James, brother of the Lord ( from ,  and , , can also be Anglicized as "Jacob"), was "a brother of Jesus", according to the New Testament. He was an early leader of the Jerusalem Church of the Apostolic Age. Traditionally, it is believed he was martyred in AD 62 or 69 by being stoned to death by the Pharisees on order of High Priest Ananus ben Ananus.

Catholics and Eastern Orthodox Christians teach that James, along with others named in the New Testament as "brothers" of Jesus, were not the biological children of Mary, mother of Jesus, but were possibly cousins of Jesus, or step-brothers from a previous marriage of Joseph (as related in the non-canonical Gospel of James).

The Catholic tradition holds that this James is to be identified with James, son of Alphaeus, and James the Less. It is agreed by most that he should not be confused with James, son of Zebedee also known as James the Great.

Epithet
Eusebius records that Clement of Alexandria related, "This James, whom the people of old called the Just because of his outstanding virtue, was the first, as the record tells us, to be elected to the episcopal throne of the Jerusalem church." Other epithets are "James the brother of the Lord, surnamed the Just," and "James the Righteous".

He is sometimes referred to in Eastern Christianity as "James Adelphotheos", meaning "James the Brother of God". The oldest surviving Christian liturgy, the Liturgy of St James, uses this epithet.

Leader of the Jerusalem Church

The Jerusalem Church

The Jerusalem Church was an early Christian community located in Jerusalem, of which James and Peter were leaders. According to a universal tradition the first bishop was the Apostle James the Less, the "brother of the Lord". His predominant place and residence in the city are implied by Galatians 1:19. Eusebius says he was appointed bishop by Peter, James (the Greater), and John (II, i).

According to Eusebius, the Jerusalem church escaped to Pella during the siege of Jerusalem by the future Emperor Titus in 70 AD and afterwards returned, having a further series of Jewish bishops until the Bar Kokhba revolt in 130 AD. Following the second destruction of Jerusalem and the rebuilding of the city as Aelia Capitolina, subsequent bishops were Greeks.

Leader

James the Just was "from an early date, with Peter, a leader of the Church at Jerusalem and from the time when Peter left Jerusalem after Herod Agrippa's attempt to kill him, James appears as the principal authority who presided at the Council of Jerusalem."

The Pauline epistles and the later chapters of the Acts of the Apostles portray James as an important figure in the Jewish Christian community of Jerusalem. When Paul arrives in Jerusalem to deliver the money he raised for the faithful there, it is to James that he speaks, and it is James who insists that Paul ritually cleanse himself at Herod's Temple to prove his faith and deny rumors of teaching rebellion against the Torah (Acts 21:18). This was a charge of antinomianism. In Paul's account of his visit to Jerusalem in Galatians 1:18-19, he states that he stayed with Cephas (better known as Peter) and James, the brother of the Lord, was the only other apostle he met.

Paul describes James as being one of the persons to whom the risen Christ showed himself, (1 Corinthians 15:3–8). In Galatians 2:9, Paul mentions James with Cephas and John the Apostle as the three "pillars" of the Church. Paul describes these pillars as the ones who will minister to the "circumcised" (in general Jews and Jewish Proselytes) in Jerusalem, while Paul and his fellows will minister to the "uncircumcised" (in general Gentiles) (Galatians 2:12), after a debate in response to concerns of the Christians of Antioch. The Antioch community was concerned over whether Gentile Christians need be circumcised to be saved, and sent Paul and Barnabas to confer with the Jerusalem church. James played a prominent role in the formulation of the council's decision. James was the last named figure to speak, after Peter, Paul, and Barnabas; he delivered what he called his "decision" (Acts 15:13-21). The original sense is closer to "opinion". James supported them all in being against the requirement (Peter had cited his earlier revelation from God regarding Gentiles) and suggested prohibitions about eating blood as well as meat sacrificed to idols and fornication. This became the ruling of the council, agreed upon by all the apostles and elders and sent to the other churches by letter.

Modern interpretation
The Encyclopædia Britannica relates that "James the Lord's brother was a Christian apostle, according to St. Paul, although not one of the original Twelve Apostles." According to Protestant theologian Philip Schaff, James seems to have taken the place of James the son of Zebedee, after his martyrdom, around 44 AD.

Modern historians of the early Christian churches tend to place James in the tradition of Jewish Christianity; whereas Paul emphasized faith over observance of Mosaic Law, James is thought to have espoused the opposite position.

According to Schaff, James was the local head of the oldest church and the leader of the most conservative portion of Jewish Christianity. Scholar James D. G. Dunn has proposed that Peter was the "bridge-man" between the two other "prominent leading figures", Paul and James the Just.

Sources
Apart from a handful of references in the synoptic Gospels, the main sources for the life of James the Just are the Pauline epistles, the Acts of the Apostles, Josephus, Eusebius and Jerome, who also quote the early Christian chronicler Hegesippus and Epiphanius. There is no mention of James in the Gospel of John or the early portions of the Acts of the Apostles. The Synoptics mention his name, but provide no further information.

In the extant lists of Pseudo-Hippolytus of Rome, Dorotheus of Tyre, the Chronicon Paschale, and Dimitry of Rostov, he is the first of the Seventy Apostles though some sources, such as the Catholic Encyclopedia, state that "these lists are unfortunately worthless".

Josephus

According to Josephus, in his work Antiquities of the Jews (Book 20, Chapter 9, 1), refers to the stoning of "James the brother of Jesus" by order of Ananus ben Ananus, a Herodian-era High Priest.

The James referred to in this passage is most likely the James to whom the Epistle of James has been attributed. The translations of Josephus' writing into other languages have at times included passages that are not found in the Greek texts, raising the possibility of interpolation, but this passage on James is found in all manuscripts, including the Greek texts.

The context of the passage is the period following the death of Porcius Festus, and the journey to Alexandria by Lucceius Albinus, the new Roman Procurator of Judea, who held that position from 62 CE to 64 CE.  Because Albinus' journey to Alexandria had to have concluded no later than the summer of 62 CE, the date of James' death can be assigned with some certainty to around that year. The 2nd century chronicler Hegesippus also left an account of the death of James, and while the details he provides diverge from those of Josephus, the two accounts share similar elements.

Modern scholarship has almost universally acknowledged the authenticity of the reference to "the brother of Jesus, who was called Christ, whose name was James" (τὸν ἀδελφὸν Ἰησοῦ τοῦ λεγομένου Χριστοῦ, Ἰάκωβος ὄνομα αὐτῷ) and has rejected its being the result of later Christian interpolation. Moreover, in comparison with Hegesippus' account of James' death, most scholars consider Josephus' to be the more historically reliable. Some scholars have noted Josephus is more sympathetic to James than his brother.

New Testament
The New Testament mentions several people named James. The Pauline epistles, from about the sixth decade of the 1st century, have two passages mentioning a James. The Acts of the Apostles, written sometime between 60 and 150 AD, also describes the period before the destruction of Jerusalem in 70 AD. It has three mentions of a James. The Gospels, with disputed datings ranging from about 50 to as late as 130 AD, describe the period of Jesus's ministry, around 30-33 AD. It mentions at least two different people named James. The author of the Epistle of Jude notes that he is a brother of James in that epistle's opening paragraph.

Epistle of James

The Epistle of James has been traditionally attributed to James the Just since 253, but, according to Dan McCartney, it is now common for scholars to disagree on its authorship.

Pauline epistles
Paul mentions meeting James "the Lord's brother" (τὸν ἀδελφὸν τοῦ κυρίου) and later calls him one of the pillars (στύλοι) in the Epistle to the Galatians :

A "James" is mentioned in Paul's First Epistle to the Corinthians, 1 Corinthians 15:7, as one to whom Jesus appeared after his resurrection:

In the preceding verse, the same Greek word "adelphos" (brother) is used, but not in a blood-relation sense:

Acts of the Apostles
There is a James mentioned in Acts, which the Catholic Encyclopedia identifies with James, the brother of Jesus: "but he [Peter], beckoning unto them with the hand to hold their peace, declared unto them how the Lord had brought him out of the prison. And he said, Go show these things unto James, and to the brethren. And he departed, and went into another place. (Acts 12:17)

When Peter, having miraculously escaped from prison, must flee Jerusalem due to Herod Agrippa's persecution, he asks for James to be informed (Acts 12:17).

James is also an authority in the early church at the Council of Jerusalem (James is quoting Amos 9:11–12): 
 James is presented as a principal author of the Apostolic Decree of Acts 15.

After this, there is only one more mention of James in Acts, meeting with Paul shortly before Paul's arrest: "And when we were come to Jerusalem, the brethren received us gladly. And the day following Paul went in with us unto James; and all the elders were present. (Acts 21:17–18)

Gospels
The Synoptic Gospels, similarly to the Epistle to the Galatians, recognize a core group of three disciples (Peter, John and James) having the same names as those given by Paul. In the list of the disciples found in the Gospels, two disciples whose names are James, the son of Alphaeus and James, son of Zebedee are mentioned in the list of the twelve disciples: (Matthew 10:1–4)
And he called to him his twelve disciples and gave them authority over unclean spirits, to cast them out, and to heal every disease and every affliction.  The names of the twelve apostles are these: first, Simon, who is called Peter, and Andrew his brother; James the son of Zebedee, and John his brother; Philip and Bartholomew; Thomas, and Matthew the tax collector; James the son of Alphaeus, and Thaddaeus; Simon the Cananaean, and Judas Iscariot, who betrayed him.

The Gospel of Mark and the Gospel of Matthew also mention a James as Jesus's brother: "Is not this the carpenter, the son of Mary, the brother of James, and Joses, and of Juda, and Simon? and are not his sisters here with us? And they were offended at him."
The Gospel of John never mentions anyone called James, but mentions Jesus's unnamed "brothers" as being present with Mary when Jesus attended the wedding at Cana (John 2:12), and later that his brothers did not believe in him (John 7:5).

Church Fathers
Fragment X of Papias (writing in the second century) refers to "James the bishop and apostle".

Hegesippus (2nd century), in the fifth book of his Commentaries, mentions that James was made a bishop of Jerusalem but he does not mention by whom: "After the apostles, James the brother of the Lord surnamed the Just was made head of the Church at Jerusalem."

Hegesippus (c.110–c.180), wrote five books (now lost except for some quotations by Eusebius) of Commentaries on the Acts of the Church. In describing James's ascetic lifestyle, Eusebius's Ecclesiastical History (Book II, 23) quotes Hegesippus' account of James from the fifth book of Commentaries on the Acts of the Church:

Clement of Alexandria (late 2nd century) wrote in the sixth book of his Hypotyposes that James the Just was chosen as a bishop of Jerusalem by Peter, James (the Greater) and John:

Clement, in the seventh book of the same work, relates also the following concerning him: 

According to Eusebius (3rd/4th century) James was named a bishop of Jerusalem by the apostles: "James, the brother of the Lord, to whom the episcopal seat at Jerusalem had been entrusted by the apostles". Jerome wrote the same: "James... after our Lord's passion... ordained by the apostles bishop of Jerusalem..." and that James "ruled the church of Jerusalem thirty years".

Epiphanius (4th century), bishop of Salamis, wrote in his work The Panarion (AD 374–375) that "James, the brother of the Lord died in virginity at the age of ninety-six".

According to Jerome (4th century), James, the Lord's brother, was an apostle, too; Jerome quotes Scriptures as a proof in his work "The Perpetual Virginity of Blessed Mary", writing the following:

Early Christian apocrypha
Some apocryphal gospels testify to the reverence Jewish followers of Jesus had for James. The Gospel of the Hebrews confirms the account of Paul in 1 Corinthians regarding the risen Jesus's appearance to James. Jerome (5th century) quotes the non-canonical Gospel of the Hebrews: 
 

The Gospel of Thomas confirms the account of Paul in 1 Corinthians regarding the risen Jesus's appearance to James. The Gospel of Thomas relates that the disciples asked Jesus, after his resurrection and before his Ascension, "We are aware that you will depart from us. Who will be our leader?" Jesus said to them, "No matter where you come [from] it is to James the Just that you shall go, for whose sake heaven and earth have come to exist.". Epiphanius (Panarion 29.4) describes James as a Nazirite.

The pseudepigraphical First Apocalypse of James associated with James's name mentions that James and Jesus are not biological brothers, with a rather fragmentary account of the departure (possibly meaning martyrdom) of James appended to the bottom of the manuscript.

The pseudepigraphical Second Apocalypse of James names James's father Theudas rather than Joseph, who is presented as the biological father of James.

The Apocryphon of James, the sole copy of which was found in the Nag Hammadi library and which may have been written in Egypt in the 3rd century, recounts a post-resurrection appearance of the risen Christ to James and Peter that James is said to have recorded in Hebrew.

The Gospel of James (or "Infancy Gospel of James"), a work of the 2nd century, also presents itself as written by James so that his authorship would lend authority.

In a 4th-century letter pseudographically ascribed to the 1st century Clement of Rome, James was called the "bishop of bishops, who rules Jerusalem, the Holy Church of the Hebrews, and all the Churches everywhere".

Relationship to Jesus, Mary and Joseph
Jesus's brothers James as well as Jude, Simon and Joses are named in Matthew 13:55 and Mark 6:3 and mentioned elsewhere. James's name always appears first in lists, which suggests he was the eldest among them. In Jewish Antiquities (20.9.1), Josephus describes James as "the brother of Jesus who is called Christ".

Interpretation of the phrase "brother of the Lord" and similar phrases is divided between those who believe that Mary had additional children after Jesus (e.g., historian Charles Freeman) and those who hold the perpetual virginity of Mary (Catholics, Eastern Orthodox, and some Protestants, such as many Anglicans and some Lutherans). The only Catholic doctrine which has been defined regarding the "brothers of the Lord" is that they are not biological children of Mary; thus, Catholics do not consider them as siblings of Jesus.

Near-contemporary sources insist that James was a "perpetual virgin" from the womb, a term which according to Robert Eisenman was later converted to his mother, Mary.

Younger half-brother, son of Mary and Joseph
Some writers, such as R.V. Tasker and D. Hill, interpret the Matthew 1:25 statement that Joseph "knew her not until she had brought forth her firstborn son" as meaning that Joseph and Mary did have normal marital relations after Jesus's birth, and that James, Joses, Jude, and Simon, were the natural sons of Mary and Joseph and, thus, half brothers of Jesus. Others, such as K. Beyer, point out that the Greek  ('until') after a negative "often has no implication at all about what happened after the limit of the 'until' was reached". Raymond E. Brown also argues that "the immediate context favors a lack of future implication here, for Matthew is concerned only with stressing Mary's virginity before the child's birth".

In addition, Mary, Joseph, and Jesus's brothers or siblings are often described together, without reference to any other relatives (Matthew 12:46–49, Mark 3:31–34, Mark 6:3, Luke 8:19–21, John 2:12, Acts 1:14), and Jesus's brothers are described without allusion to others (John 7:2–5, 1 Corinthians 9:5. For example, Matthew 13:55–56 says, "Isn't this the carpenter's son? Isn't his mother's name Mary, and aren't his brothers James, Joseph, Simon, and Jude? Aren't all his sisters with us?" and John 7:5 says, "Even his own brothers did not believe in him."

Clement of Alexandria, Tertullian, and Helvidius were among the theologians who thought that Mary had children other than Jesus. Jerome asserts in his tract The Perpetual Virginity of Blessed Mary, as an answer to Helvidius, that the term "first-born" was used to refer to any offspring that opened the womb, rather than definitely implying other children. Luke's reporting of the visit of Mary, Joseph, and Jesus to the Temple of Jerusalem when Jesus was 12 years old makes no reference to any of Jesus's half-brothers.

The modern scholar Robert Eisenman is of the belief that Luke, as a close follower of Pauline Gentile Christianity, sought to minimise the importance of Jesus's family by whatever means possible, editing James and Jesus's brothers out of the Gospel record. Karl Keating argues that Mary and Joseph rushed without hesitation straight back to Jerusalem, when they realized Jesus was lost, which they would surely have thought twice about doing if there were other children (Jesus's siblings) to look after.

Older stepbrother, son of Joseph by an earlier marriage
The Gospel of James (a 2nd-century apocryphal gospel also called the Protoevangelium of James or the Infancy Gospel of James) says that Mary was betrothed to Joseph and that he already had children. In this case, James was one of Joseph's children from his previous marriage and, therefore, Jesus's stepbrother.

The bishop of Salamis, Epiphanius, wrote too in his work The Panarion (AD 374–375) that "...James (brother of Jesus) was Joseph's son by Joseph's first wife, not by Mary..." He adds that Joseph became the father of James and his three brothers (Joses, Simeon, Judah) and two sisters (a Salome and a Mary or a Salome and an Anna) with James being the elder sibling. James and his siblings were not children of Mary but were Joseph's children from a previous marriage. After Joseph's first wife died, many years later when he was eighty, "he took Mary (mother of Jesus)". According to Epiphanius the Scriptures call them "brothers of the Lord" to confound their opponents.

One argument supporting this view is that it would have been against Jewish custom for Jesus to give his mother to the care of John (who is not at all suspected to be a blood relative of Jesus) if Mary had other living sons. This is because the eldest son would take responsibility for his mother after the death of her husband; any other sons of Mary should have taken on this responsibility if they existed, therefore arguing against a direct natural brother relationship.

Also, Aramaic and Hebrew tended to use circumlocutions to point out blood relationships; it is asserted that just calling some people "brothers of Jesus" would not have necessarily implied the same mother. Rather, something like "sons of the mother of Jesus" would have been used to indicate a common mother. Scholars and theologians who assert this point out that Jesus was called " son of Mary" rather than " son of Mary" in his hometown (Mark 6:3).

Cousin, son of a sister of Mary
James, along with the others named "brothers" of Jesus, are said by others to have been Jesus's cousins. This is justified by the fact that cousins were also called "brothers" and "sisters" in Jesus's native language, Aramaic, which, like Biblical Hebrew, does not contain a word for 'cousin'. Unlike some other New Testament authors, apostle Paul had a perfect command of Greek, a language which has a specific word for 'cousin' and another for 'brother' calling James "the brother of our Lord" (Galatians 1:19).

Eusebius of Caesarea reports the tradition that James the Just was the son of Joseph's brother Clopas and therefore was of the "brothers" (which he interprets as "cousin") of Jesus described in the New Testament.

Jerome refers to the scene of the crucifixion in John 19:25, where three women named Mary Mary, the mother of Jesus, Mary of Clopas, and Mary Magdalene are said to be witnesses. John also mentions the "sister" of the mother of Jesus, often identified with Mary of Clopas due to grammar. Mary "of Clopas" is often interpreted as Mary, "wife of Clopas". Mary of Nazareth and Mary of Clopas also need not be literally sisters, in light of the usage of the said words in Greek, Hebrew and Aramaic.

Mary of Clopas is suggested to be the same as "Mary, the mother of James the younger and Joses", "Mary the mother of James and Joseph" and the "other Mary" in Jesus's crucifixion and post-resurrection accounts in the Synoptic Gospels. Proponents of this identification argue that the writers of the Synoptics would have called this Mary, simply, "the mother of Jesus" if she was indeed meant to be the mother of Jesus, given the importance of her son's crucifixion and resurrection: they also note that the mother of James and Joses is called "Maria", whereas the mother of Jesus is "Mariam" or "Marias" in Greek. These proponents find it unlikely that Mary would be referred to by her natural children other than Jesus at such a significant time (James happens to be the brother of one Joses, as spelled in Mark, or Joseph, as in Matthew).

Jerome's opinion suggests an identification of James the Just with the Apostle James, son of Alphaeus; Clopas and Alphaeus are thought to be different Greek renderings of the same Aramaic name Khalphai. Despite this, some biblical scholars tend to distinguish them; this is also not Catholic dogma, though a traditional teaching.

Since this Clopas is, according to Eusebius, Joseph of Nazareth's brother (see above) and Mary of Clopas is said to be Mary of Nazareth's sister, James could be related to Jesus by blood and law.

Younger half-brother, son of Mary and a second husband
A variant on this is presented by James Tabor, who argues that after the early and childless death of Joseph, Mary married Clopas, whom he accepts as a younger brother of Joseph, according to the Levirate law. According to this view, Clopas fathered James and the later siblings, but not Jesus.

John Dominic Crossan suggested that James was probably Jesus's older brother.

Identification with James, son of Alpheus, and with James the Less
A Mary is also mentioned as the mother of James, the younger and of Joseph in the Gospel of Mark:

On the other hand, another Mary is mentioned as the mother of a James and of a Joseph in the Gospel of Matthew and in the Gospel of Mark:

Catholic interpretation generally holds that James, the younger is the same James mentioned in Mark 16:1 and Matthew 27:56 and it is to be identified with James, the son of Alphaeus and James, the brother of Jesus. According to the Catholic Encyclopedia, he is not identified with James the Great, although this is disputed by some.

Possible identity with James, son of Alphaeus

Jerome believed that the "brothers" of the Lord were Jesus's cousins, thus amplifying the doctrine of perpetual virginity. Jerome concluded that James "the brother of the Lord", (Galatians 1:19) is therefore James, son of Alphaeus, one of the Twelve Apostles of Jesus, and the son of Mary Cleophas.

In two small but potentially important works of Hippolytus, On the Twelve Apostles of Christ and On the Seventy Apostles of Christ, he relates the following:

James, the brother of Jesus, was also stoned to death by the Jews.

These two works of Hippolytus are often neglected because the manuscripts were lost during most of the church age and then found in Greece in the 19th century. As most scholars consider them spurious, they are often ascribed to Pseudo-Hippolytus. The two are included in an appendix to the works of Hippolytus in the voluminous collection of Early Church Fathers.

According to the surviving fragments of the work Exposition of the Sayings of the Lord of the Apostolic Father Papias of Hierapolis, who lived , Cleophas and Alphaeus are the same person, and Mary the wife of Cleophas or Alphaeus would be the mother of James the brother of Jesus, and of Simon and Judas (Thaddeus), and of one Joseph.

Thus James, the brother of the Lord would be the son of Alphaeus, who is the husband of Mary the wife of Cleophas or Mary the wife of Alphaeus. The identification of James as the son of Alpheus was perpetuated into the 13th century in the hagiography The Golden Legend by Jacobus de Voragine.

Possible identity with James the Less
Jerome also concluded that James "the brother of the Lord" is the same as James the Less. To explain this, Jerome first tells that James the Less must be identified with James, the son of Alphaeus, and reports in his work The Perpetual Virginity of Blessed Mary the following:

After saying that James the Less is the same as James, the son of Mary of Cleophas, wife of Alphaeus and sister of Mary the Lord's mother, Jerome describes in his work  that James "the brother of the Lord" is the same as James, the son of Alpaheus and Mary of Cleophas:

Thus, Jerome concludes that James, the son of Alphaeus, James the Less, and James, brother of the Lord, are one and the same person.

Other relationships
Also, Jesus and James could be related in some other way, not strictly "cousins", following the non-literal application of the term  and the Aramaic term for 'brother'. According to the apocryphal First Apocalypse of James, James is not the earthly brother of Jesus, but a spiritual brother<ref>"The First Apocalypse of James's' also denies that James is blood relative of Jesus" in, Watson E. Mills (general editor), Mercer Dictionary of the Bible, page 429 (Mercer University Press, 1991). </ref> who according to the Gnostics "received secret knowledge from Jesus prior to the Passion".

Death

Clement of Alexandria relates that "James was thrown from the pinnacle of the temple, and was beaten to death with a club".

Hegesippus cites that "the Scribes and Pharisees placed James upon the pinnacle of the temple, and threw down the just man, and they began to stone him, for he was not killed by the fall. And one of them, who was a fuller, took the club with which he beat out clothes and struck the just man on the head".

According to a passage found in existing manuscripts of Josephus' Antiquities of the Jews (20.9.1), "the brother of Jesus, who was called Christ, whose name was James" met his death after the death of the procurator Porcius Festus but before Lucceius Albinus had assumed office  which has been dated to 62. Josephus reports that Hanan's act was widely viewed as little more than judicial murder and offended a number of "those who were considered the most fair-minded people in the city, and strict in their observance of the Law", who went so far as to arrange a meeting with Albinus as he entered the province in order to petition him successfully about the matter. In response, King Agrippa II replaced Ananus with Jesus son of Damneus.

Origen related an account of the death of James which gave it as a cause of the Roman siege of Jerusalem, something not found in the existing manuscripts of Josephus."Origen appreciates Josephus by noting that he has 'researched on the cause of the fall of Jerusalem and the destruction of the temple' and concludes that Josephus is 'not far from the truth' in concluding that the reason for the calamity was the assassination of James the Just by the Jews", in "Origen and Josephus" by Wataru Mizugaki, in Louis H. Feldman, Gohei Hata (editors), Josephus, Judaism and Christianity, page 329 (Wayne State University Press, 1987). 

Eusebius wrote that "the more sensible even of the Jews were of the opinion that this (James' death) was the cause of the siege of Jerusalem, which happened to them immediately after his martyrdom for no other reason than their daring act against him. Josephus, at least, has not hesitated to testify this in his writings, where he says, "These things happened to the Jews to avenge James the Just, who was a brother of Jesus, that is called the Christ. For the Jews slew him, although he was a most just man.""

Eusebius, while quoting Josephus' account, also records otherwise lost passages from Hegesippus (see links below) and Clement of Alexandria (Historia Ecclesiae, 2.23). Hegesippus' account varies somewhat from what Josephus reports and may be an attempt to reconcile the various accounts by combining them. According to Hegesippus, the scribes and Pharisees came to James for help in putting down Christian beliefs. The record says:

Accordingly, the scribes and Pharisees

Vespasian's siege and capture of Jerusalem delayed the selection of Simeon of Jerusalem to succeed James.

According to Philip Schaff in 1904, this account by "Hegesippus has been cited over and over again by historians as assigning the date of the martyrdom to 69," though he challenged the assumption that Hegesippus gives anything to denote such a date. Josephus does not mention in his writings how James was buried.

Feast day
In the Catholic Church, the feast day of Philip the Apostle, along with that of James the Lesser (Catholics identify him with James the Just as the same person), was traditionally observed on 1 May, the anniversary of the church dedicated to them in Rome (now called the Church of the Twelve Apostles). Then this combined feast transferred to May 3 in the current ordinary calendar.

In the Eastern Orthodox Church, James is commemorated as "Apostle James the Just, brother of Our Lord", and as such, multiple days are assigned to his feasts. His feast days are on October 23, December 26 and the next Sunday of the Nativity along with King David and Saint Joseph and January 4 among the Seventy Apostles.

In the Episcopal Church of the United States of America and Lutheran Church, James, brother of Jesus and martyr is commemorated on October 23.

James is remembered (with Philip) in the Church of England with a Festival on 1 May.

The ossuary controversy

In the November 2002 issue of Biblical Archaeology Review, André Lemaire of the Sorbonne University in Paris published the report that an ossuary bearing the inscription  ("James son of Joseph brother of Jesus") had been identified belonging to a collector, Oded Golan. The ossuary was exhibited at the Royal Ontario Museum in Toronto, Ontario, Canada, late that year; but on June 18, 2003, the Israeli Antiquities Authority published a report concluding, based on an analysis of the patina, that the inscription is a modern forgery. Specifically, it appeared that the inscription had been added recently and made to look old by addition of a chalk solution. Following this, the Ossuary was removed by the Royal Ontario Museum.

On December 29, 2004, Golan was indicted in an Israeli court along with three other men Robert Deutsch, an inscriptions expert who teaches at Haifa University; collector Shlomo Cohen; and antiquities dealer Faiz al-Amaleh. They were accused of being part of a forgery ring that had been operating for more than 20 years. Golan denied the charges against him. According to the BBC, "when the police took Oded Golan into custody and searched his apartment they discovered a workshop with a range of tools, materials, and half finished 'antiquities'. This was evidence for a fraud of a scale far greater than they had suspected." On March 14, 2012, Golan was declared not guilty of all charges of forgery, although with the judge saying this acquittal "does not mean that the inscription on the ossuary is authentic or that it was written 2,000 years ago" and "it was not proven in any way that the words 'the brother of Jesus' necessarily refer to the 'Jesus' who appears in Christian writings" and that there is "nothing in these findings which necessarily proves that the items were authentic".

The Israeli Antiquities Authority and several scholars still maintain that the James Ossuary is a modern forgery, and the artefact is not usually quoted by scholars of the historical Jesus.

See also

 Divine Liturgy of Saint James
 List of biblical figures identified in extra-biblical sources
 Related Bible parts: Matthew 13, Matthew 27, Mark 6, Mark 15, Mark 16, Acts 12, Acts 15, Acts 21, 1 Corinthians 15, Galatians 1, Galatians 2; James 1; Epistle of Jude

Notes

References

Bibliography
 Richard Bauckham. James: Wisdom of James, disciple of Jesus the sage. London: Routledge, 1999.  (-3); Jude and the Relatives of Jesus in the Early Church. London: T & T Clark, 1990, 2004.  (paperback).
 Raymond E. Brown. An Introduction to the New Testament. New York: Doubleday, 1997. 
 Robert Eisenman; James the Brother of Jesus: The Key to Unlocking the Secrets of Early Christianity and the Dead Sea Scrolls, Viking Penguin, 1997.
 John Painter. Just James. Columbia: University of South Carolina, 1997 , review
 Hershel Shanks and Ben Witherington, The Brother of Jesus. New York: HarperSanFrancisco, 2003. 
 Francis Watson. Paul, Judaism and the Gentiles. Cultural background.
 Jonathan Bourgel, "James the Just, One Among Many Oblias", NTS 59 (2013), 222–46, (French).
 Biblical Archaeology Review  Articles in various issues in 2004 and 2005 concerning the ossuary.

External links

 The Real Jesus Christ, documentary about Jesus from the perspective of James and the Jerusalem Church, Channel 4
 "The martyrdom of James, the brother of the Lord" Quotes from lost writings of Hegesippus in Eusebius
 Josephus, Antiquities of the Jews (Book 20, Chapter 9)
 Jerome, De Viris Illustribus Chapter 2.
 
 James in the 1911 Encyclopædia Britannica''
 

 
Year of birth unknown
60s deaths
Year of death uncertain
1st-century bishops of Jerusalem
1st-century Christian martyrs
1st-century Jews
Brothers of Jesus
Burials at the Cathedral of Saint James, Jerusalem
Christian clerical marriage
Followers of Jesus
Founders of religions
Ancient letter writers
People executed by stoning
People in Acts of the Apostles
Saints from the Holy Land
Seventy disciples
Anglican saints